Ogulcan Bekar (born 1 September 2000) is an Austrian former professional footballer who last played as a forward for Austrian Bundesliga club SC Rheindorf Altach and the Austria U18 national team.

Career

Club career
On 7 January 2020 SC Rheindorf Altach confirmed the signing of Bekar. Since 2019, Bekar have had a heart failure, which continued to bother him after his arrival at Altach. For that reason, he was out for the first six month since his transfer and later confirmed his retirement.

Personal life
Born in Austria, Bekar is of Turkish descent.

References

External links 

Living people
2000 births 
Austrian footballers
Austria youth international footballers
Austrian people of Turkish descent
2. Liga (Austria) players
FC Red Bull Salzburg players
FC Liefering players
SC Rheindorf Altach players
Association football forwards